The 2022 Campeonato Ecuatoriano de Fútbol Segunda Categoría, officially known as the 2022 Ascenso Nacional, is the 49th season of the Segunda Categoría, Ecuador's third tier football league. The season began on 15 March with the provincial stage, the national stage began on 10 September and is scheduled to end in 19 November 2022.

Qualified teams
The following list shows the teams that qualified for the National Stage.

Format
The competition is a single-elimination tournament, from the first round to the semi-finals are played as a two-legged ties, the final is played as a single match in neutral venue. All sixty four teams enter in the first round, order is decided by draw.

Schedule
The schedule of the competition is as follows:

First round
The draw for the first round was held on 5 September 2022, 16:00 at FEF headquarters in Guayaquil. In a first draw, the 32 teams, seeded by their FEF ranking, were drawn into 16 ties. The home and away teams of each leg were decided in a second draw. The first legs were played on 10–12 September and the second legs were played on 16–18 September 2022.

|}

Second round
The draw for the second round was held on 19 September 2022, 16:00 at FEF headquarters in Guayaquil. In a first draw, the 16 teams, seeded by their FEF ranking, were drawn into 8 ties. The home and away teams of each leg were decided in a second draw. The first legs were played on 23–28 September and the second legs were played on 30 September–2 October 2022.

|}

Final rounds
In the final rounds, each tie will be played on a home-and-away two-legged basis. If the aggregate score is level, the second-leg match will go straight to the penalty shoot-out to determine the winners.

Bracket

Round of 16
The first legs were played on 7–9 October and the second legs were played on 14–16 October 2022.

|}

Quarter-finals
The first legs were played on 21–25 October and the second legs were played on 29–30 October 2022.

|}

Semi-finals
The first legs were played on 5–6 November and the second legs were played on 12–13 November 2022. Winners were promoted to 2023 Ecuadorian Serie B.

|}

Final
The final will be played in November 2022 at Estadio 7 de Octubre in Quevedo.

Top scorers

See also
 2022 Ecuadorian Serie A
 2022 Ecuadorian Serie B
 2022 Copa Ecuador

Notes

References

External links
 FEF's official website 
 Official webpage 
 Segunda Categoría summary (SOCCERWAY)

A
Ecuador
3
Ecu